Barrasso is a surname. Notable people with the surname include:

John Barrasso (born 1952), United States Senator from Wyoming
Tom Barrasso (born 1965), American ice hockey coach and player